Silas Lillard  Bryan (November 4, 1822 – March 30, 1880) was a judge and member of the Illinois Senate.

Silas Lillard Bryan, of Scots-Irish and English descent, was an avid Jacksonian Democrat.  Silas won election to the Illinois State Senate in 1852 and again in 1856 but was defeated for re-election in 1860. He did win election as a state circuit judge for the 2nd Judicial Circuit, and moved to a  farm north of Salem in 1866, living in a ten-room house that was the envy of Marion County. He retained his position on the bench through 1873.

Bryan and his wife, Mariah Elizabeth (née Jennings), were the parents of nine children, including William Jennings Bryan and Charles W. Bryan. Also, Ruth Bryan Owen was a granddaughter.

References

External links

1822 births
1880 deaths
Democratic Party Illinois state senators
Illinois state court judges
Bryan family
American people of Scotch-Irish descent
American people of English descent
People from Marion County, Illinois
People from Culpeper County, Virginia
19th-century American politicians